Tom Smith (Thomas J. Smith, P.E.) is an American highway engineer and former West Virginia state government official. He was fired on March 10, 2019 by Governor Jim Justice as West Virginia's Secretary of Transportation over a dispute about maintenance of secondary roads.

He was appointed to the position in 2017.>

Smith's successor as secretary of transportation is Byrd White, who took office on March 26, 2019.

References

American civil engineers
Secretaries of Transportation of West Virginia
Living people
1950s births